Aleksandr Vadimovich Gitselov (born 24 November 1963) is a former Russian professional footballer.

Club career
He made his professional debut in the Soviet Second League in 1981 for FC Rostselmash Rostov-on-Don. He played in the Soviet Top League for FC Torpedo Moscow from 1988 to 1991. He played for lower league Swedish clubs after 1995.

Personal life
He is the father of Peter Gitselov.

References

1963 births
Living people
Soviet footballers
Russian footballers
Association football forwards
FC Taganrog players
FC SKA Rostov-on-Don players
FC Rostov players
FC Torpedo Moscow players
Zagłębie Lubin players
Östers IF players
IFK Luleå players
Soviet Top League players
Ekstraklasa players
Allsvenskan players
Soviet expatriate footballers
Russian expatriate footballers
Expatriate footballers in Poland
Expatriate footballers in Sweden
Russian expatriate sportspeople in Poland